Wang Yanwen is a Chinese association football player who plays for Beijing BG Phoenix. She studied in the Beijing Sport University.

International goals

References

1999 births
Living people
Chinese women's footballers
China women's international footballers
Footballers at the 2020 Summer Olympics
Olympic footballers of China
Women's association footballers not categorized by position